The following active airports serve the area around Red Deer, Alberta, Canada:

See also

 List of airports in the Calgary area
 List of airports in the Edmonton Metropolitan Region
 List of airports in the Fort McMurray area
 List of airports in the Lethbridge area

References

 
Airports Red Deer
 
Red Deer
Red Deer